Lee Yong (born June 23, 1978) is a South Korean luger who has competed since 1997. He finished 43rd in the men's singles event at the FIL World Luge Championships 2007 in Igls. Lee qualified for the 2010 Winter Olympics, finishing 36th in the men's singles event.

References

FIL-Luge profile

External links
 
 
 

1978 births
Living people
South Korean male lugers
Olympic lugers of South Korea
Lugers at the 1998 Winter Olympics
Lugers at the 2010 Winter Olympics